Bryan Schutmaat (born November 3, 1983) is an American photographer based in Texas, USA. Schutmaat book's include Grays the Mountain Sends (2013), which won the Aperture Foundation Portfolio Prize; Islands of the Blest (2014); and Good Goddamn (2017). His work is held in the collections of Baltimore Museum of Art, Hood Museum of Art, Middlebury College Museum of Art, Museum of Fine Arts, Houston and San Francisco Museum of Modern Art.

Life and work
Schutmaat was born in Houston, Texas in 1983.

His first book, Grays the Mountain Sends (2013) portrays mountain towns and former mining communities of the American West through portraits of people and landscapes. The work was inspired by Montana poet Richard Hugo. He made the work with a large format 4x5" view camera. 

Islands of the Blest (2014), is a compilation of historic photographs taken in the American West from the 1870s to the 1970s. He and Ashlyn Davis sourced from the online archives of the Library of Congress and United States Geological Survey. 

Good Goddamn (2017) is about a friend "from rural Texas and his last few days of freedom before going to prison." The book was the first publication of Trespasser, a Texas-based art book publisher Schutmaat co-founded.

Publications

Books by Schutmaat
Grays the Mountain Sends. New York City: Silas Finch Foundation, 2013. . Edition of 600 copies.
Second edition. New York City: Silas Finch Foundation, 2014. . Edition of 1200 copies.
Good Goddamn. Austin, TX: Trespasser, 2017. . Edition of 750 copies.
Second edition. Austin, TX: Trespasser, 2018. With a letter by Kris. Edition of 750 copies.

Books paired with another
Islands of the Blest. New York City: Silas Finch Foundation, 2014. Edited by Schutmaat and Ashlyn Davis. . With a poem by Michael McGriff, "Letter sewn into a pantcuff of smoke". Edition of 800 copies.
Second edition. New York City: Silas Finch Foundation, 2016.

Awards
Aperture Portfolio Prize, Aperture Foundation, New York City, winner, 2013 for Grays the Mountain Sends
Paris Photo–Aperture Foundation PhotoBook Awards, First Book Award, shortlisted, 2013 for Grays the Mountain Sends
The New York Photo Awards, photobook category, winner, 2014, for Grays the Mountain Sends
John Simon Guggenheim Memorial Fellowship, 2020

Collections
Schutmaat's work is held in the following public collections:
Baltimore Museum of Art: 2 prints
Hood Museum of Art: 1 print
Middlebury College Museum of Art, Middlebury College, Middlebury, VT: 1 print
Museum of Fine Arts, Houston: 1 print
San Francisco Museum of Modern Art: 2 prints

References

External links

Gallery of photos at CNN

1983 births
People from Houston
Living people
American portrait photographers
Landscape photographers